The 2012 Thai FA Cup Final was the 19th final of Thailand's domestic football cup competition, the FA Cup. The final was played at Suphachalasai Stadium in Bangkok on 4 November 2012. The match was contested by Army United, who beat Police United 2–1 in their semi-final, and Buriram United who beat Bangkok Glass 2–0 in the match. After Goran Jerković opened the scoring in 37th minute, Goran Jerković equalised in the 62nd, before Issarapong Lilakorn the different beater to army united and Buriram United beat Army United 2–1 .

Road to the final

Note: In all results below, the score of the finalist is given first (H: home; A: away; TPL: Clubs from Thai Premier League; D1: Clubs from Thai Division 1 League; D2: Clubs from Regional League Division 2). Army United won because Trat players that break the rules.

Match

Details

Assistant referees:
 Hiroyuki Igarashi  (Japan)
 Hiroshi Yamauchi  (Japan)
Fourth official:
 Sumate Saiwaew (Thailand)
MATCH RULES
90 minutes.
30 minutes of extra-time if necessary.
Penalty shootout if scores still level.
Nine named substitutes
Maximum of 3 substitutions.

2012
1